Gyula Benczúr (28 January 1844, Nyíregyháza – 16 July 1920, Szécsény) was a Hungarian painter and art teacher. He specialized in portraits and historical scenes.

Biography

His family moved to Kassa when he was still very young and he displayed an early talent for drawing. He began his studies in 1861 with Hermann Anschutz and Johann Georg Hiltensperger (1806–1890). From 1865 to 1869, he studied with Karl von Piloty.

He achieved international success in 1870 when he won the Hungarian national competition for historical painting with his depiction of King Stephen's baptism. He then assisted Piloty with the frescoes at the Maximilianeum and the Rathaus in Munich and illustrated books by the great German writer, Friedrich Schiller. King Ludwig II of Bavaria gave him several commissions.

He was named a Professor at the Academy of Fine Arts, Munich, in 1875. Soon after, he built a home in Ambach on Lake Starnberg; designed by his brother Béla. In 1883, he returned to Hungary, where he continued to be an art teacher. One of his most distinguished pupils was the Swiss-born American painter Adolfo Müller-Ury. Benczúr was later a favorite among the Hungarian upper-class, painting numerous portraits of kings and aristocrats. He also created some religious works; notably altarpieces for St. Stephen's Basilica and Buda Castle.

He was an honorary member of the Hungarian Academy of Sciences. Streets have been named after him in Balassagyarmat, Balatonkenese, Berettyóújfalu, Bonyhád, Budapest, Debrecen, Jászberény, Komló, Pécs, Szabadszállás, Szeged and Košice.  His daughters Olga (1875–1962) and Ida (1876–1970) also became well-known artists.

Selected paintings

Sources
Gyula Benczúr, Exposition Memoriale. Budapest: Hungarian National Museum, 1958
 Gábor Ö. Pogány,. Nineteenth Century Hungarian Painting, (1958) Reprint, Budapest: Corvina Press, 1972
Katalin Telepy, Benczúr. Nyíregyháza, Hungary: Jósa András Múzeum, 1963
Antal Kampis, The History of Art in Hungary. Budapest: Corvina Press, 1966

External links

Works and biography of Gyula Benczúr @ Fine arts in Hungary
Works of Gyula Benczúr held in Slovak art collections

1844 births
1920 deaths
Academic art
Members of the Hungarian Academy of Sciences
Academic staff of the Academy of Fine Arts, Munich
Hungarian illustrators
19th-century Hungarian painters
19th-century Hungarian male artists
20th-century Hungarian painters
20th-century Hungarian male artists
Hungarian male painters